Kitu and Woofl is an Australian children's television series which aired on ABC TV on 6 October 1997 and 10 November 1997 and was repeated until 17 May 2005.

It follows Kitu, a curious, mischievous and friendly little alien who lives on another planet who makes his own adventures along with his best friend and loyal and intelligent pet dog, Woofl.

Episode list
(partial)
 "Dadoo's Little Helper" 
 "Kitu Comes Clean" 
 "Kitu Goes Shopping" 
 "Soap Operetta" 
 "The Picnic"
 "Alien Babysitter"
 "Tantrum Techniques"
 "Stray Poofl"
 "Saying Sorry"
 "Breakfast In Bed"
 "First Day"
 "Tumba Rhumba"
 "Nit Picking"
 "Dadoo's Home"
 "Too Big Too Small"
 "Time for Bed"
 "If at First"
 "Shelvy Boxes"
 "The Boy Who Cried Wolf"
 "French Frock Farce"
 "Nya Nya Nya Nyaaah Nya
 "The Little Drummer Boy"
 "The Visit"
 "Booberry Fields"
 "Swing Out Sister"
 "It's My Party"

Australian Broadcasting Corporation original programming
Australian children's animated television series
Animated television series about dogs
Animated television series about extraterrestrial life
1997 Australian television series debuts
1997 Australian television series endings
1990s Australian animated television series
Stop-motion animated television series